Naadi Dosh is a 2022 Gujarati-language  film, directed by Krishnadev Yagnik starring Yash Soni,  Raunaq Kamdar,. and Janki Bodiwala produced by Nilay Chotai, Munna Shukul, & Harshad Shah. and distributed by Panorama Studios

Plot 
New generation love birds, Riddhi and Kevin, shrewdly tackle the issue of 'Naadi Dosh', a mismatch or 'dosh' amongst two astrological charts of individuals which may cause issues after marriage.

Cast
 Yash Soni
 Janki Bodiwala
 Raunaq Kamdar
 Prashant Barot
 Dipika Raval 
 Ashish Kakkad
 Ravi Gohil
 Maitri Joshi
 Ridham Rajyaguru
 Karan Dave
 Ratilal Parmar
 Rahul Goswami
 Kalpesh Shukal
 Ronak Madgut
 Chinmay Parmar
 Ditya Mistry

Development  
Official trailer of the movie was launched on 17 May 2022 on YouTube Channel.  and the music was acquired by Panorama Studios. For the marketing and promotion and Colors Gujarati had joined hands on the project. The music of the film was given by Kedar-Bhargav. The first song Lavva Lavvi sung by Jigardan Gadhavi and Vrattini Ghadge   and 2nd song  Chandaliyo was sung by Aishwarya Majumdar.

Soundtrack

Tracklist
The soundtrack of the album is composed by Kedar - Bhargav with lyrics written by Bhargav Purohit. The soundtrack album consists of Two tracks. Three song of the film has been released by Panorama Studios

References

External links
 

2022 films
2020s Gujarati-language films
Films set in Ahmedabad
Films shot in Ahmedabad
Films shot in Gujarat
Films directed by Krishnadev Yagnik